Gaius Julius Mento was a member of the ancient patrician gens Julia, who held the consulship in BC 431.

Family
As Mento's filiation has not been preserved, it is not clear how he was related to other members of the Julia gens.  He could perhaps have been a son of Vopiscus Julius Iulus, consul in BC 473; he had a brother named Gaius, and his known sons included Lucius Julius Iulus, who was consular tribune in 438 and consul in 430, and Spurius, whose sons held three tribuneships between 408 and 403; the Sextus Julius Iulus who was consular tribune in 424 might also have been his son.  Perhaps less likely, Mento could have been the son of Gaius Julius Iulus, the consul of 447 and 435 BC.  It is equally possible that Mento was not descended from the Julii Iuli at all, but rather from a more obscure line of the Julii, who by tradition had lived at Rome for a century and a half before the first of them to hold a Roman magistracy.

Career
Consul in BC 431 with Titus Quinctius Pennus Cincinnatus, Mento quickly found himself in perpetual disagreement with his colleague.  During their year of office, the Aequi and the Volsci fortified a position on Mount Algidus, and at least some ancient chroniclers report that the consuls attempted to dislodge them, but were defeated.  Owing to this situation, as well as the unease caused by an ongoing epidemic at Rome, the senate directed the consuls to appoint a dictator.

On one thing Mento and Cincinnatus could agree: they did not want to appoint a dictator.  However, the clamor to do so was widespread, and at last the tribunes of the plebs threatened to imprison the consuls if they refused to do so.  Even as they complained bitterly about the oppression of the masses compelling the action of the consuls by threat of jail, the consuls preferred to yield to popular demands than to the senate.  But they could not agree on a dictator, and so drew lots for the nomination, which fell to Cincinnatus.  He named his father-in-law, Aulus Postumius Tubertus, who chose Lucius Julius Iulus as his magister equitum.

After raising his army, Postumius marched on the Aequi and Volsci, together with Cincinnatus, leaving the two Julii behind, in charge of Rome's defenses.  The magister equitum manned the city walls, while Mento oversaw domestic affairs.  The fighting at Mount Algidus was fierce; the dictator was wounded in the shoulder, and the consul Cincinnatus lost an arm; but at last the Romans won a decisive victory.

While the army was away, Mento dedicated the Temple of Apollo Medicus, which had been vowed two years earlier in response to the plague that was ravaging the city, and which had continued into Mento's consulship.  Ordinarily, the two consuls would have drawn lots for the honour of dedicating the temple, but in the absence of Cincinnatus, the duty fell to Mento.  Nonetheless, upon the army's return, Cincinnatus lodged a complaint against Mento in the senate; but the senate took no action.

Footnotes

See also
Julia (gens)

References

Bibliography
 Titus Livius (Livy), Ab Urbe Condita (History of Rome).
 Diodorus Siculus, Bibliotheca Historica (Library of History).
 "Mento, C. Julius", in the Dictionary of Greek and Roman Biography and Mythology, William Smith, ed., Little, Brown and Company, Boston (1849).
 T. Robert S. Broughton, The Magistrates of the Roman Republic, American Philological Association (1952).

5th-century BC Roman consuls
Mento, Gaius